Ernest Benn Limited was a British publishing house.

Sir John Benn

Founded by Sir John Benn as Benn Brothers in 1880, it started as the publisher of the trade journal, The Cabinet Maker.

Ernest Benn

After Sir John was elected to Parliament in 1892, he passed control of the firm to his eldest son Ernest, who became managing director and started publishing more trade journals, such as Gas World, the Fruit Grower and the Electrician, as well as "technical books for each specialized public".  In 1923, Ernest changed the name of the firm to Ernest Benn Limited. However, the name 'Benn Brothers' was subsequently revived with the formation of Benn Brothers plc.

Benn hired Victor Gollancz in 1921. Gollancz published a very successful series of art books.  He later recruited the writers Edith Nesbit, Robert W. Service and H. G. Wells.

Thanks to Gollancz's gifts as a publisher, the company's turnover increased 100-fold in seven years.  But Benn was unwilling to cede control of the company to him.  Moreover, Benn had moved to the political right and Gollancz to the left.  Gollancz left the firm in 1927 to form his own firm, Victor Gollancz Limited.

The firm published a number of books for children and young people, including The Story of the Amulet (1927) by E. Nesbit, Moominsummer Madness (1955) by Tove Jansson, Donkey Days (1977) by Helen Cresswell, and Sybil and the Blue Rabbit (1979) by Jane Johnson.

Book series

In addition to individual books, Ernest Benn Limited was known for a number of series:

 Benn's Essex Library
 Benn's Yellow Books
 The Blue Guides – travel guides (previously published by Muirhead)
 Chats Series: Practical Handbooks for Collectors
 Contemporary British Artists 
 Contemporary British Dramatists
 Drawings of the Great Masters
 Kai Khosru Monographs on Eastern Art
 Leaders in Philosophy
 Mermaid Critical Commentaries
 Mermaid Series – reprints of English Elizabethan, Jacobean and Restoration plays
 The New Mermaids – new version of Benn's Mermaid Series
 New Ninepenny Novels
 The Players' Shakespeare
 Self and Society Booklets 
 Sixpenny Library – early paperback educational series
 Sixpenny Poets 
Stead's Poets, begun by W. T. Stead in 1895 and re-issued by Benn from  ?–1926 
 Stories of the Commonwealth Series
 Tolley Tax Guides
 University College (London) Monographs on English Mediæval Art

1980s

Ernest Benn Ltd, along with Benn Brothers plc and the other members of the Benn Group of Companies, was taken over by the Extel Group in June 1983. Extel was taken over by United Newspapers in 1987.

References

Book publishing companies of the United Kingdom
Publishing companies established in 1880
1880 establishments in the United Kingdom